The 1942 Boston Red Sox season was the 42nd season in the franchise's Major League Baseball history. The Red Sox finished second in the American League (AL) with a record of 93 wins and 59 losses, nine games behind the New York Yankees.

Red Sox left fielder Ted Williams won the Triple Crown, leading the AL in home runs (36), runs batted in (137), and batting average (.356).

Offseason 
 December 13, 1941: Stan Spence and Jack Wilson were traded by the Red Sox to the Washington Senators for Johnny Welaj and Ken Chase.

Regular season

Season standings

Record vs. opponents

Notable transactions 
 June 1, 1942: Jimmie Foxx was selected off waivers from the Red Sox by the Chicago Cubs.

Opening Day lineup

Roster

Player stats

Batting

Starters by position 
Note: Pos = Position; G = Games played; AB = At bats; H = Hits; Avg. = Batting average; HR = Home runs; RBI = Runs batted in

Other batters 
Note: G = Games played; AB = At bats; H = Hits; Avg. = Batting average; HR = Home runs; RBI = Runs batted in

Pitching

Starting pitchers 
Note: G = Games pitched; IP = Innings pitched; W = Wins; L = Losses; ERA = Earned run average; SO = Strikeouts

Other pitchers 
Note: G = Games pitched; IP = Innings pitched; W = Wins; L = Losses; ERA = Earned run average; SO = Strikeouts

Relief pitchers 
Note: G = Games pitched; W = Wins; L = Losses; SV = Saves; ERA = Earned run average; SO = Strikeouts

Awards and honors

League leaders 
 Ted Williams, American League home run leader (36), RBI leader (137), and batting average leader (.356)

Farm system 

LEAGUE CHAMPIONS: Scranton, Greensboro

KITTY League folded, June 19, 1942

References

External links

1942 Boston Red Sox team page at Baseball Reference
1942 Boston Red Sox season at baseball-almanac.com

Boston Red Sox seasons
Boston Red Sox
Boston Red Sox
1940s in Boston